Gigolete is a 1924 Brazilian silent drama film directed by Vittorio Verga. Most of the film has been destroyed with age although about 2 minutes of the finale has been restored today.

The film premiered in Rio de Janeiro on 4 June 1924.

Cast
Amélia de Oliveira as  Liz 
Augusto Aníbal as  Maneco 
Jaime Costa as  Alvaro 
Arthur Oliveira as  Dr. Elzeman 
Artur de Oliveira Júnior 
M. Arrisagna   
Eugênia Brasão   
Aurora Fúlgida   
Maria Grilo   
José Loureiro   
Teixeira Pinto   
Adelina Simi   
Leonel Simi   
Luiza Valle   
Célia Zanatti

External links
 

1924 films
Brazilian black-and-white films
Brazilian silent films
1924 drama films
Brazilian drama films
Lost Brazilian films
1924 lost films
Lost drama films
Silent drama films